Gonzaga College High School is a private Catholic college-preparatory high school for boys in Washington, D.C. Founded by the Jesuits in 1821 as the Washington Seminary, Gonzaga is named in honor of Aloysius Gonzaga, an Italian saint from the 16th century. Gonzaga is the oldest boys' high school in the District of Columbia.

History

Gonzaga was officially founded by  Anthony Kohlmann, a Jesuit, in 1821, though there is some evidence the school began a few years earlier. It is the oldest educational facility in the original federal city of Washington and was at first called Washington Seminary, operating under the charter of Georgetown College (now Georgetown University), which was becoming too crowded for its space at the time. Gonzaga's original location was on land offered to the Society of Jesus by William Matthews on F Street near 10th Street, N.W., in a building adjoining Saint Patrick's Church. The purpose of this school was to train seminarians, but soon after opening, it began admitting lay students. The school was immediately popular among Catholic families and was well enough known in its early years to attract the attention of President John Quincy Adams, who visited the school to test the boys' Latin and Greek. However, there were financial problems that caused the Jesuits to withdraw in 1827: their order prohibited the charging of tuition at a day school for youth. It continued to be run by laity until the Jesuits returned some twenty years later (with the ordinance regarding tuition changed); President Zachary Taylor presided at the commencement exercises in 1849.

In 1858, Gonzaga was granted its own charter by Congress as a college empowered to confer degrees in the arts and sciences, which accounts for its name (Gonzaga College) to this day. Although some students did receive bachelor's degrees in the 19th century, Gonzaga no longer confers degrees, other than honorary doctorates presented to commencement speakers or other notable guests. In 1871, the school moved to a building (now called Kohlmann Hall) in a neighborhood called Swampoodle located just north of the U.S. Capitol. It was located on the same block as St. Aloysius Church – built in 1859 and now on the U.S. Register of Historic Buildings with a high Roman Catholic population surrounding it. Enrollment declined owing to the distance of the new neighborhood from the center, but the Jesuits persevered and by the end of the 19th century the school was once again flourishing. A theater was built in 1896 and a large new classroom building (previously the Main Building and now called Dooley Hall) was opened in 1912.

John Gabriel Smith, Gonzaga's first African-American graduate, entered the school in 1951. He wanted to prepare to be a priest and none of the schools for black children offered the necessary prerequisites, including Latin. When he decided to try out for the varsity football team, the school was unable to schedule games against public schools, which were still segregated at the time. He was ultimately prevented from playing by an injury. He graduated in 1954.

The curriculum of Gonzaga from its founding until the late 20th century was at once rigorously classical and emphatically Catholic. Mastery of Latin and deep involvement in the Catholic religion were at its core. Standards were high, and many hopeful boys who lacked the necessary qualities for success were denied admittance. To this day, Gonzaga admits approximately one third of applicants.

Gonzaga benefited greatly from the fact that the row houses built in Swampoodle were largely occupied by Irish Catholics from the late 19th century on. Although Gonzaga always drew students from other parts of the city as well, the departure of the Swampoodle Irish for the suburbs in the mid-20th century, and more especially their replacement by poorer non-Catholics, brought on another period of difficulties. A decline in enrollment and the great inner-city riot of 1968 led some to suggest that Gonzaga should be closed, or moved to a more affluent area. However, the Jesuits once again persisted and the school survived. In the last years of the 20th century Gonzaga expanded, adding several new buildings and a large playing field and field house. By 2007 Gonzaga had regained its former status and a Wall Street Journal editorial referred to it as "the premier Catholic high school of  Washington."

St. Aloysius

St. Aloysius is a parish church physically attached to Gonzaga through the entrance building Dooley Hall. The church was built in 1859. It is used for Masses, concerts, some school assemblies, and graduation. The large painting above the altar is the work of Constantino Brumidi, famous for painting the frescoes on the interior of the United States Capitol dome.

Athletics

Gonzaga's athletic teams are called the Eagles. Gonzaga fields seventeen different varsity teams, most of which compete in the Washington Catholic Athletic Conference.

The Gonzaga soccer team won four consecutive WCAC championships from 2007 to 2010, and is consistently one of the best teams in the Washington area. They added additional championships in 2012, 2016, and 2017, beating national powerhouse DeMatha Catholic in each.

Gonzaga rugby has won 12 consecutive Potomac Rugby Union Championships and finished the 2010 season ranked #2 in the nation. In the middle of the  2011 season, Gonzaga beat the #1 ranked team in the nation and rival, Xavier, and became the #1 team in the nation. During the 2011 National Championship in Salt Lake City, Utah, Gonzaga finished 3rd. The Eagles won the High School Rugby National Championship in 2014, 2015, 2016 and 2018.

The Gonzaga crew team won the Stotesbury Cup Regatta on the Schuylkill River, Philadelphia in 2012, 2013, 2014, 2015, and 2016. Runner up years include: 2009, 2017, and 2018.

Out of the past 17 seasons (2000-2016) Gonzaga Cross Country has finished in first, second, or third place in the WCAC Championship race every time. The team won the WCAC championship in 2005, 2008, 2009, 2010, and 2012. Additionally, in 2010 the Gonzaga Cross Country team won the "triple crown" with first-place finishes in the WCAC Championship, the MD/DC Private/Independent Schools Championship, and the Jesuit Championship. The Eagles XC squad has won the Jesuit Championships in 1987, 2002, 2009, 2010, and 2016. The team also added their first victory at the DC State Championships during the 2016 season. 2016 marked another milestone for Gonzaga Cross Country. The JV Boys team managed to complete the "triple crown", winning the JV WCAC Championship, the JV MD/DC Private/Independent Schools Championship, and the JV Jesuit Championship.

Varsity 2 hockey won their respective Mid Atlantic Prep Hockey League (MAPHL) “A” league in 2016, 2017, and 2018. Varsity 1 hockey won their “AA” division in 2017 and 2018. Gonzaga is the first school in MAPHL history to have a back-to-back sweep of both divisions in two consecutive years. In the 2018–2019 season, Varsity 1 defeated Spaulding 5–1 to win their third straight MAPHL AA championship, a huge accomplishment for a team with two freshman goalies that year.

Buchanan Field is the home field for football and lacrosse and also serves as the practice facility for rugby, soccer and track and field. The Carmody Center hosts basketball and select wrestling matches. Old Gym is the wrestling home match site. The Fort Dupont Ice Arena hosts ice hockey games. Gravelly Point is the home grounds for rugby matches and Long Bridge Park is the home facility for soccer games. The game and practice venue for baseball is located at the Washington Nationals Youth Academy.

Notable faculty 
Joseph A. Canning, president of Loyola College in Maryland
 Rev. William F. Troy, President of Wheeling Jesuit University

List of presidents

Notable alumni

Academia
Thomas R. Fitzgerald, S.J., sixth president of Fairfield University and the 30th president of Saint Louis University
Jesse Mann, emeritus of philosophy at Georgetown University
 Arthur A. O'Leary, S.J., president of Georgetown University (1935–1942)

Arts and entertainment
Michael J. Bobbitt, playwright, director, choreographer (Class of 1990)
David Costabile, actor (Class of 1985)
Owen Danoff, musician and contestant on The Voice (Class of 2007)
Demetrius Grosse, actor (Class of 1999)
Brian Hallisay, actor (Class of 1996)
John Heard, actor (Class of 1964)

Athletes
Johnson Bademosi, NFL cornerback (Class of 2008)
Nate Britt, professional basketball player, attended but transferred before graduating.
Mike Banner, professional soccer player, played for SIU-Edwardsville (Class of 2002)
Colin Cloherty, NFL tight end for Indianapolis Colts (Class of 2005)
Curome Cox, NFL safety for Denver Broncos (Class of 1999)
 Robert Churchwell, NBA player for the Golden State Warriors. (Class of 1990)
Olu Fashanu, offensive tackle
A. J. Francis, NFL defensive tackle (Class of 2008)
Billy Glading, Lacrosse All-American and midfielder for the Chesapeake Bayhawks (MLL) (Class of 1999)
Joey Haynos, NFL tight end for Miami Dolphins (Class of 2003)
Darryl Hill, first African American football player at Naval Academy and in Atlantic Coast Conference (Maryland, Class of 1960)
Kevin Hogan, NFL quarterback (Class of 2011)
Kris Jenkins, forward for Villanova Wildcats, 2016 national champions (Class of 2013)
Cam Johnson, NFL player for Cleveland Browns (Class of 2008)
Malcolm Johnson, Notre Dame and NFL wide receiver
Jon Morris, NFL player for New England Patriots (Class of 1960)
Roman Oben, NFL player for San Diego Chargers and Super Bowl champion with Tampa Bay Buccaneers (Class of 1990)
Paul Sheehy, rugby player for USA Eagles at 1991 Rugby World Cup (Class of 1981)
Tom Sluby, NBA player for Dallas Mavericks (Class of 1980)
John Thompson III, basketball head coach at Georgetown University 2004-17 (Class of 1984)
Ian Harkes, professional soccer player, Hermann Trophy winner (Class of 2013)
Caleb Williams, college football player and Heisman Trophy recipient

Business
Thomas W. Farley, president of the NYSE Group, including the New York Stock Exchange (Class of 1993)
Jim Kimsey, co-founder of America Online, attended but dismissed and attended St. John's College High School

Journalism and publishing
Bob Considine, journalist and author
Pat Conroy, author, attended but did not graduate
Joseph Ellis, Pulitzer Prize-winning author and history professor at Mount Holyoke College (Class of 1961)
Michael Kelly, Washington Post columnist, editor of The New Republic, and editor-at-large of The Atlantic Monthly (Class of 1975)
Lance Morrow, journalist and writer for Time magazine (Class of 1958)
Peter Ruehl, columnist for Australian Financial Review

Military
 Brigadier General John M. K. Davis, commander of Artillery districts during the Spanish–American War (Class of 1858)
 Major General John R. Ewers Jr., USMC, Staff Judge Advocate to the Commandant (Class of 1977)
 Navy SEAL Lieutenant Commander Erik S. Kristensen who died while fighting in Afghanistan (Class of 1990)
Air Force General John M. Loh, Air Force vice chief of staff and commander of Air Combat Command, Fighter Pilot with 200 combat missions in Vietnam War (Class of 1956)
Captain Humbert Roque "Rocky" Versace, United States, POW, Medal of Honor recipient, Pentagon Hall of Heroes inductee, Ranger Hall of Fame inductee (Class of 1955)

Politics and law
James A. Belson, District of Columbia judge (Class of 1949)
William Bennett, author, radio host, former Secretary of Education, and first "drug czar" of the United States (Class of 1961)
Don Beyer, Congressman-elect for Virginia's 8th congressional district, former Lieutenant Governor of Virginia U.S. ambassador to Switzerland and Liechtenstein (Class of 1968)
Pat Buchanan, Republican Party presidential candidate (1992, 1996), Reform Party presidential candidate (2000), author, and syndicated columnist (Class of 1956)
Ken Cuccinelli, former Attorney General of Virginia, former Virginia State Senator, 37th District (Class of 1986)
Lawrence Hogan, father of Governor of Maryland Larry Hogan and former United States Representative for Maryland's 5th congressional district (Class of 1946)
Patrick N. Hogan, former member, Maryland House of Delegates (Class of 1997)
Martin O'Malley, former Governor of Maryland and former Mayor of Baltimore (Class of 1981)
Ben Quayle, former United States Representative for Arizona's 3rd congressional district (Class of 1994)
William Nathaniel Roach, U.S. Senator from North Dakota
Charles L. Schultze, former chairman, United States Council of Economic Advisers, Bronze Star recipient, Purple Heart recipient, World War II (Class of 1942)
Steve Shannon, Virginia House of Delegates, 35th District, attended, did not graduate
Judge E. Gregory Wells, Appellate Court of Maryland, 2019-, Chief Judge, 2022- , Formerly a judge of the Circuit Court of Calvert County, Maryland and the District Court of Maryland. (Class of 1979).

Science
Elliott Coues (1842-1899), physician, ornithologist, mammalogist.  Coues white tail deer is named for him.
James Pilling (1846–1895), pioneer ethnologist who compiled extensive bibliographies on Native American languages and culture
B. Alvin Drew, United States Air Force captain, NASA astronaut  (Class of 1980)

Others
Eric O'Neill, former FBI operative who played a major role in the arrest and conviction of FBI agent Robert Hanssen for spying
David Herold, hanged for participation in Lincoln's assassination

See also
 List of Jesuit sites

References

Citations

Sources

External links
 
 Gonzaga College School - advertisement for Gonzaga in 1913

1821 establishments in Washington, D.C.
Boys' schools in the United States
Catholic secondary schools in Washington, D.C.
Educational institutions established in 1821
Former Georgetown University schools
 
Jesuit high schools in the United States
Landmarks in Washington, D.C.